ABSET was an early declarative programming language from the University of Aberdeen.

See also
 ABSYS

References
"ABSET: A Programming Language Based on Sets", E.W. Elcock et al., Mach Intell 4, Edinburgh U Press, 1969, pp. 467–492

Declarative programming languages